Vidra Lake is a storage reservoir, located in the Parâng Mountains group, on the Lotru River, in Vâlcea County, Romania.

The dam and the hydro plant were built between 1965 and 1972. It is the second largest hydro plant in Romania, after the Iron Gates I and II power stations.

See also
List of lakes in Romania
Reservoirs and dams in Romania

External links
Dams of Romania
Hydroelectric Power Plant
Construction of Hydroelectric Power Plant
Romania in images - Vidra Lake

Vidra
Reservoirs in Romania
RVidra